Bouni (Sumo) is a Skou language of Papua New Guinea. It is spoken in Sumo village of West Aitape Rural LLG, Sandaun Province, located near the border with Indonesia.

References

Sources
Miller, Steve A. 2017. Skou Languages Near Sissano Lagoon, Papua New Guinea. Language and Linguistics in Melanesia 35: 1-24.

Languages of Sandaun Province
Piore River languages